Eight Stories Inside Quebec was a Canadian documentary television miniseries which aired on CBC Television in 1966.

Premise
This series of eight documentaries concerned Quebec life and culture, presented for an English-Canadian audience, hosted by Peter Desbarats who later hosted La Difference.

Production
CBC Montreal produced all episodes except "What Went Wrong with Belgium?" which was produced out of CBC's London bureau in conjunction with Aujourd'hui, a French-language series.

Scheduling
This half-hour series was broadcast Wednesdays at 10:30 p.m. (Eastern) from 20 July to 7 September 1966.

Episodes
 20 July 1966: "Jean-Paul Desbiens" (Arnold Gelbart director; Howard Ryshpan writer)
 27 July 1966: "This Blooming Business of Bilingualism" (Peter Pearson director)
 3 August 1966: "Between Two Worlds" (Felix Lazarus director; C. J. Newman writer), regarding the Jewish community in Montreal
 10 August 1966: "Where are the English of Yesteryear?", exploring the decline of Quebec City's English population through the eyes of a young girl from London, England
 17 August 1966: "Confederation of Two, directed by Dennis Miller director; Marion Andre Czerniecki story editor), about three mixed-language couples
 24 August 1966: "The Ballad of Louis Cyr (Arnold Gelbart director; Sidetracks musical score)
 31 August 1966: "What Went Wrong with Belgium?" (Dennis Miller director)
 7 September 1966: "What's the Matter With Old McGill?" (Dennis Miller director; Richard Gwyn and Sandra Gwyn writers)

References

External links
 

CBC Television original programming
1966 Canadian television series debuts
1966 Canadian television series endings